Tsuga (from Japanese , the name of Tsuga sieboldii) is a genus of conifers in the subfamily Abietoideae of Pinaceae, the pine family. The common name hemlock is derived from a perceived similarity in the smell of its crushed foliage to that of the unrelated plant poison hemlock. Unlike the latter, Tsuga species are not poisonous.

The genus comprises eight to ten species (depending on the authority), with four species occurring in North America and four to six in eastern Asia.

Description
The leading shoots generally droop. The bark is scaly and commonly deeply furrowed, with the colour ranging from grey to brown. The branches stem horizontally from the trunk and are usually arranged in flattened sprays that bend downward towards their tips. Short spur shoots, which are present in many gymnosperms, are weakly to moderately developed. The young twigs, as well as the distal portions of stem, are flexible and often pendent. The stems are rough due to pulvini that persist after the leaves fall. The winter buds are ovoid or globose, usually rounded at the apex and not resinous.

They are borne singly and are arranged spirally on the stem; the leaf bases are twisted so the leaves lie flat either side of the stem or more rarely radially. Towards the base, the leaves narrow abruptly to a petiole set on a forward-angled pulvinus. The petiole is twisted at the base so it is almost parallel with the stem. The leaf apex is either notched, rounded, or acute. The undersides have two white stomatal bands (which are inconspicuous on T. mertensiana) separated by an elevated midvein. The upper surface of the leaves lack stomata, except those of T. mertensiana. They have one resin canal that is present beneath the single vascular bundle.

The pollen cones grow solitary from lateral buds. They are usually up to in length, ovoid, globose, or ellipsoid, and yellowish-white to pale purple, and borne on a short peduncle. The pollen itself has a saccate, ring-like structure at its distal pole, and rarely this structure can be more or less doubly saccate. Maturation occurs in 5–8 months, and the seeds are shed shortly thereafter; the cones are shed soon after seed release or up to a year or two later. The seed scales are thin, leathery, and persistent. They vary in shape and lack an apophysis and an umbo. The bracts are included and small. They also contain small adaxial resin vesicles. Seed germination is epigeal; the seedlings have 4–6 cotyledons.

Taxonomy
Mountain hemlock (T. mertensiana) is unusual in the genus in several respects. Some botanists treat it in a distinct genus as Hesperopeuce mertensiana (Bong.) Rydb., though it is more generally only considered distinct at the rank of subgenus.

Another species, bristlecone hemlock, first described as T. longibracteata, is now treated in a distinct genus Nothotsuga; it differs from Tsuga in the erect (not pendulous) cones with exserted bracts, and male cones clustered in umbels, in these features more closely allied to the genus Keteleeria.

Species 
 Accepted living species
 Tsuga canadensis – eastern hemlock – Eastern Canada, Eastern United States
 Tsuga caroliniana – Carolina hemlock – Southern Appalachians
 Tsuga chinensis – Taiwan hemlock – much of China incl Tibet + Taiwan
 Tsuga diversifolia – northern Japanese hemlock – Honshu, Kyushu
 Tsuga dumosa – Himalayan hemlock – Himalayas, Tibet, Yunnan, Sichuan
 Tsuga forrestii – Forrest's hemlock – Sichuan, Yunnan, Guizhou
 Tsuga heterophylla – western hemlock – Western Canada, Northwestern United States
 Tsuga × jeffreyi  – British Columbia, Washington
 Tsuga mertensiana – mountain hemlock – Alaska, British Columbia, Western United States
 Tsuga sieboldii – southern Japanese hemlock – Japan
 Tsuga ulleungensis – Ulleungdo hemlock – Ulleungdo island, Korea

Accepted paleospecies
 †Tsuga aburaensis  - Abura, Hokkaido (Miocene)
 †Tsuga asiatica - Lawula Formation, Tibet (Priabonian)
 †Tsuga europaea -Maria Theresia mine Aachen (Miocene)
 †Tsuga nanfengensis - Yunnan Province (Late Miocene)
 †Tsuga swedaea - Buchanan Lake Formation, Axel Heiberg Island (Lutetian)
 †Tsuga taxoides - Inner Mongolia (Early Cretaceous)

 †Tsuga xianfengensis - Yunnan Province (late Miocene)

 Formerly included
Moved to other genera: Cathaya Keteleeria Nothotsuga Picea Pseudotsuga Taxus

Ecology
The species are all adapted to (and are confined to) relatively moist, cool temperate areas with high rainfall, cool summers, and little or no water stress; they are also adapted to cope with heavy to very heavy winter snowfall and tolerate ice storms better than most other trees.  Hemlock trees are more tolerant of heavy shade than other conifers; they are, however, more susceptible to drought.

Threats 
The two eastern North American species, T. canadensis and T. caroliniana, are under serious threat by the sap-sucking insect Adelges tsugae (hemlock woolly adelgid). This adelgid, related to the aphids, was introduced accidentally from eastern Asia, where it is only a minor pest. Extensive mortality has occurred, particularly east of the Appalachian Mountains. The Asian species are resistant to this pest, and the two western American hemlocks are moderately resistant. In North America, hemlocks are also attacked by hemlock looper. Larger infected hemlocks have large, relatively high root systems that can bring other trees down if one falls.  The foliage of young trees is often browsed by deer, and the seeds are eaten by finches and small rodents.

Old trees are commonly attacked by various fungal disease and decay species, notably Heterobasidion annosum and Armillaria species, which rot the heartwood and eventually leave the tree liable to windthrow, and Rhizina undulata, which may kill groups of trees following minor grass fires that activate growth of the Rhizina spores.

Uses
The wood obtained from hemlocks is important in the timber industry, especially for use as wood pulp. Many species are used in horticulture, and numerous cultivars have been selected for use in gardens. The bark of the hemlock is also used in tanning leather.
The needles of the hemlock tree are sometimes used to make a tea and perfume.

References

External links
 
 

 
Conifer genera